The Conductive Education School, Kuwait (abbreviated CESK) was established in September 2003 to offer educational and rehabilitation services for students with special needs (including Autistic Spectrum Disorders, Global Development Delay, Attention Deficit and Hyperactivity Disorder, Down syndrome, genetic conditions and complex disorders) and in particular children and young adults with neurological motor disabilities and related conditions.

The school's aim is to enable students to function more independently at home, in educational environments, at work and in community settings. This reduces their dependency on others in essential everyday activities and makes constructive steps towards integration into society. The school is one of several that are owned by Afaq Company for Educational Services, is the second largest conductive school in the world and the first in the Arab regions. It received the First Stage of the Inclusion and Quality Mark (IQM) from the Special and Inclusive Services (SIS), UK.

The Conductive System of Education (as originally developed by the Peto Institute in Hungary), the English National Curriculum are delivered with Arabic and Islamic studies. Specialist services available include speech therapy, psychology, a social worker and extra curricula activities for registered and private students.

Facilities include a swimming pool, sensory room, conductive classrooms, special needs classrooms, TV/media rooms, computer lab, music room, library, life skills rooms, meeting room, covered play area, gardens, air conditioning, full wheelchair access, lifts, assistive IT technology, toilets for disabled people, transportation services between home and school.

The international staff group comprises professionals from Europe, America, Middle East/Gulf Region, Asia, Africa and South America including British, Americans, Canadians and Hungarians.

The school's academic year runs from September to June and the school day for pupils is from 7.30am until 1pm from Saturday to Wednesday. Religious and national holidays are observed, with a mid-year break and summer holiday.

External links
 School's website

Educational institutions established in 2003
Schools in Kuwait
Conductive education schools
Disability in Kuwait
2003 establishments in Kuwait